Zach Anderson (born November 20, 1989) is a professional American football defensive tackle who is currently a free agent. He played college football at Northern Michigan.

College career
Anderson was named All-GLIAC first team in 2012.

Professional career

Anderson attended the Cleveland Browns rookie camp after going undrafted in the 2013 NFL Draft.

Winnipeg Blue Bombers
Anderson signed with the Winnipeg Blue Bombers in May 2013.

Orlando Predators
On July 5, 2016, Anderson was assigned to the Orlando Predators.

Cleveland Gladiators
On October 14, 2016, Anderson was selected by the Cleveland Gladiators during the dispersal draft.

Personal life
His brother, Chad, also plays football and played for the Orlando Predators as well.

References

External links
 Winnipeg Blue Bombers bio 

1989 births
Living people
Northern Michigan Wildcats football players
Winnipeg Blue Bombers players
Canadian football defensive linemen
People from Sault Ste. Marie, Michigan
American players of Canadian football
American football defensive tackles
Players of American football from Michigan
Orlando Predators players
Cleveland Gladiators players